Linda Stratmann (born 1948 in Leicester, UK) is a British writer of historical true crime, biography and crime fiction.

Early life
She was born in the City of Leicester in a family which belonged to the Orthodox Jewish community. Her parents were engaged in the tailoring trade. Her grandparents had immigrated from Poland in early 1920s and her parents were born in London but during World War II they moved to Leicester. Stratmann attended Wyggeston Girls Grammar School. She graduated from Newcastle University with a degree in psychology in 1974. After graduating she joined the Civil service and trained to be an Inspector of Taxes. She moved to London in 1987 and left the Civil Service in 2001. In 2002 she published her first book, on the history of chloroform.

Creation work
Linda is the author of a crime fiction series based in Bayswater in the 1880s and featuring a lady sleuth, Frances Doughty. They are published by the Mystery Press, the fiction imprint of the History Press. 
The books in this series are:

 The Poisonous Seed (2011)
 The Daughters of Gentlemen (2012)
 A Case of Doubtful Death (2013)
 An Appetite for Murder (2014)
 The Children of Silence (2015)
 Death in Bayswater (2016)
 A True and Faithful Brother (2017)
 Murder at the Bayswater Bicycle Club (2018)

A new series starting with Mr Scarletti's Ghost, published in 2015, is set in Brighton in the 1870s and explores the world of Victorian spirit mediums. The second book, The Royal Ghost followed, and a third, An Unquiet Ghost, was published in 2018.

The Secret Poisoner, a history of criminal poisoning in the nineteenth century, was published by Yale University Press in 2016.

She has appeared in the Channel 5 television documentary, Scream, about the history of anaesthesia, Hypnosurgery Live on Channel 4,  Medical Mavericks on BBC Four by Michael J. Mosley and an episode of "Fred Dinenage: Murder Casebook".

Stratmann has had a lifelong interest in true crime. She is a trained chemists' dispenser, has a Bachelor of Science with first class honours in psychology, and is a black belt in aikido since 2000. She lives in London with her second husband.

Stratmann suffers from both hyperacusis and tinnitus.

Selected books

Fiction
 Mr Scarletti's Ghost (Mina Scarletti Mystery) (2018). Publisher: Sapere Books.
 The Royal Ghost (Mina Scarletti Mystery) (2018). Publisher: Sapere Books.
 Murder at the Bayswater Bicycle Club: A Frances Doughty Mystery (The Frances Doughty Mysteries) (2018). The History Press (1 March 2018).
 An Unquiet Ghost (Mina Scarletti Mystery Book 3) (2018). Sapere Books (1 March 2018).
 A True and Faithful Brother: A Frances Doughty Mystery (The Frances Doughty Mysteries) (2017). The Mystery Press (1 March 2017).
 A Case of Doubtful Death: A Frances Doughty Mystery (The Frances Doughty Mysteries Book 3) (2013). The History Press (1 April 2013)
 Greater London Murders: 33 Stories of Revenge, Jealousy, Greed & Lust (Sutton True Crime History) (2012).The History Press (29 February 2012)
 Essex Murders (Sutton True Crime History) (2012). The History Press; UK ed. edition (29 February 2012).
 Middlesex Murder (2012). The History Press (29 February 2012).
 Kent Murders (Sutton True Crime History) (2009). The History Press (1 January 2009).

Non-fiction
 Chloroform: the Quest for Oblivion, (2003, Sutton Publishing).  A history of the discovery, use and misuse of chloroform.
 Essex Murders (2004, Sutton Publishing)
 Whiteley’s Folly (2004, Sutton Publishing).  The story of William Whiteley, the founder of the Bayswater store, and his murder in 1907
 Gloucestershire Murders (2005, Sutton Publishing)
 The Crooks Who Conned Millions (2006 Sutton Publishing) Ten stories of nineteenth century frauds.
 Notorious Blasted Rascal: Colonel Charteris and the Servant Girl's Revenge The story of Francis Charteris, the most hated man in Britain, and his trial for rape in 1730. (2008 The History Press)
 Kent Murders (2009 The History Press)
 Greater London Murders (2010 The History Press)
 Middlesex Murders (2010 The History Press)
 Fraudsters and Charlatans is the paperback version of Crooks Who Conned Millions (2010 The History Press)
 Cruel Deeds and Dreadful Calamities: the Illustrated Police News 1864-1938 an illustrated history of the notorious newspaper, (British Library, March 2011)
 More Essex Murders (2011 The History Press)

References

External links
Personal site

1948 births
Living people
English non-fiction crime writers
English biographers
People from Leicester
21st-century English women writers